Smilie may be:

People
Smilie
 Smilie Suri, an Indian model, actress and dancer
 John Smilie (1741–1812), Irish-American politician

Smillie
 Carol Smillie, British performer
 James Smillie (fl. 1970s), British actor

See also
Emoticon
Simile, a poetic term often misspelled "smilie"
Smiley-face drawing
Smiley (disambiguation), including other roughly-face-like shapes, and people, places, etc.